Askøy is a municipality in Vestland county, Norway. The island municipality is located in the Midhordland district of the county, sitting in a large group of islands immediately northwest of the city of Bergen. The administrative centre of the municipality is the urban village of Kleppestø on the southeastern shore of the island of Askøy.

The  municipality is the 328th largest by area out of the 356 municipalities in Norway. Askøy is the 36th most populous municipality in Norway with a population of 29,816. Since the opening of the Askøy Bridge connecting it to the mainland of Bergen in 1992, the population has increased rapidly. Its population growth among the highest in Norway. Most of the population growth is due to migration from Bergen and the surrounding districts of Nordhordland and Midhordland.

General information

The parish of Askøen was established as a municipality on 1 January 1838 (see formannskapsdistrikt law). In 1879, a small area of the neighboring municipality of Fana (population: 18) was transferred to Askøen. On 1 January 1904, a small area near the village of Hanevik (population: 32) was transferred from Askøen to the neighboring municipality of Alversund. On 1 July 1918, the southern (mainland) portions of Askøy (population: 6,957) were separated from the municipality to form the new municipality of Laksevåg. This split left Askøy with 4,822 residents.
  
During the 1960s, there were many municipal mergers across Norway due to the work of the Schei Committee. On 1 January 1964, the Hanevik area (population: 193) on the island of Askøy was transferred to Askøy from the municipality of Meland. Also on that date, the old municipality of Herdla was dissolved. The parts of Herdla on the island of Askøy and the island of Herdla (population: 1,564) were also transferred to Askøy. This boundary adjustment put the entire island of Askøy, the island of Herdla, and many tiny surrounding islands in the municipality of Askøy.

Name
The first element is the name "Askøy" came from the old Ask farm and the last element is øy, meaning "island". The name of the farm is identical with the word askr, meaning "ash tree". Until 1918 the name was written as "Askøen".

Coat of arms
The coat of arms was granted on 28 September 1961. The arms are a canting showing an ash tree (ask) on an island (øy) with waves of the sea in the base of the shield.

Churches
The Church of Norway has five parishes within the municipality of Askøy. It is part of the Vesthordland prosti deanery in the Diocese of Bjørgvin.

Culture
{{Historical populations
|footnote = Source: Statistics Norway.Per 1 January 1964, 1247 Askøy and a part of 1256 Meland (193 persons) and a part of 1258 Herdla (1 564 persons) were merged to one municipality, 1247 Askøy.
|shading = off
|1951|7616
|1961|9849
|1971|14526
|1981|17148
|1991|18580
|2001|20096
|2011|25602
|2017|28821
}}

Askøy is home to several sports teams. Askøy Fotballklub is an association football club, formed in 1999 by the merger of Florvåg Idrettsforening and Kleppestø Fotball. The club has a large number of teams, of which the majority are junior football teams. The men's senior team plays in the Norwegian third division . The oldest sports club on the island is Ask Idrettslag, mainly an athletics club, founded in 1928.

The music festival Lost Weekend is held on the island every summer in Kollevågen. The festival, first held in August 2001, attracts a large number of minor Norwegian bands. The festival has been threatened by economic trouble several times.

In the village of Strusshamn are old wooden houses, dating back to the early 19th century. Strusshamn then served as a quarantine harbour for Bergen. Today, Strusshamn is one of the cultural capitals of Askøy, with a lot of activities and a museum of its own showing life on Askøy in earlier times.

Geography

Askøy is an island municipality including the main island of Askøy and the minor island of Herdla as well as many small surrounding islands. The municipality is surrounded by three fjords: Hjeltefjorden to the west and north, Byfjorden to the east, and Herdlefjorden to the northeast. The municipality borders Alver to the northeast, Bergen to the southeast, and Øygarden to the west.

Askøy has one of the fastest growing populations in Norway due to an influx of new inhabitants from the Bergen, Midhordland and Nordhordland after the opening of the Askøy Bridge in 1992. North of Askøy lies the island of Herdla, a popular recreational area on the site of the disused German Herdla Airport from World War II.

The densely populated part of the municipality is on the south and eastern coasts. Kleppestø and Strusshamn are located on the southern coast and Florvåg is on the east coast. Florvåg was connected to downtown Bergen for many decades via ferries. The northern and western parts of the island are thinly populated.

There is a large lake on the southeast part of the island, called Askevatnet. The tallest mountain on the island is Kolbeinsvarden. The recreation area of Kollevågen lies in the western part of the island.

Settlements
Ask

Ask is a village in the eastern part of Askøy. Due to its pleasant climate and its convenient location to Bergen, Ask was the location of a kongsgård'' (lit. "royal farm"); the very old Ask Church and churchyard was also located in Ask. The location where the church was situated from about 1200 until 1741 is today marked by a stone cross. Ask is the saga location for a famous dispute over inheritance between Egill Skallagrímsson and Berg-Önundr.

The local dialect of the village also reflects the close ties to Bergen, with the dialect being more similar to that of Bergen than that of the rest of Askøy except the dialect of Florvåg; the connection was reinforced into modern times as the wealthy merchants and other residents of Bergen spent their summer there. Ask has had famous residents up to recent times. Fridtjof Nansen lived in a house near Kongshaugen in a short period. Amalie Skram lived at Lien at Ask from 1876 to 1878.

Other settlements
Some of the other notable settlements in Askøy include Abbedisso, Erdal, Hanevik, Kleppestø, Skjelviki, and Tveitevåg.

Government
All municipalities in Norway, including Askøy, are responsible for primary education (through 10th grade), outpatient health services, senior citizen services, unemployment and other social services, zoning, economic development, and municipal roads. The municipality is governed by a municipal council of elected representatives, which in turn elect a mayor.  The municipality falls under the Hordaland District Court and the Gulating Court of Appeal.

Municipal council
The municipal council of Askøy is made up of 35 representatives that are elected to four year terms. The party breakdown of the council is as follows:

Mayor
The mayors of Askøy (incomplete list):
2019–present: Siv Høgtun (H)
2015-2019: Terje Mathiassen (Ap)
2011-2015: Siv Høgtun (H)
2007-2011: Knut Hanselmann (FrP)
1999-2007: Kari Manger (Ap)
1994-1999: Øyvind Fluge (KrF)
1990-1993: Oddvard Nilsen (H)
1988-1989: Øyvind Fluge (KrF)

Industry and trade
Askøy is well known for the tasty strawberries from Ask. The seafood industry is also well settled at Askøy.

Askøy also houses several boat building companies; the most famous of which are Viksund Yachts of Norway situated in Strusshamn, Viknes situated in Bakarvågen, Selby situated in Strusshamn and NB Marine situated at Herdla.

Askøy houses some big industrial facilities such as Hanøytangen, Mjølkeviksvarden, and Storebotn.

Notable people 

 Knut Robberstad (1899 in Askøy – 1981) a Norwegian jurist, philologist and academic
 Halldor Espelid (1920 in Askøy – 1944) a Norwegian Supermarine Spitfire pilot, escaped from Stalag Luft III, re-captured and shot by the Gestapo
 Ingrid Espelid Hovig (1924 in Askøy – 2018) a television chef and author of cook books
 Arne Tumyr (born 1933) a former journalist, newspaper editor and politician, grew up in Ask
 Geir Magnus Nyborg (1951 in Askøy – 2018) a Norwegian media scholar and theologian

Sport 
 Trygve Andersen (born 1934 in Askøy) retired footballer, 27 caps for Norway
 Martin Jensen (1942 in Askøy – 2016) a Norwegian triple jumper
 Frode Syvertsen (born 1963 in Askøy) a speed skater, competed at the 1988 Winter Olympics

See also
 Askøy (island)

References

External links

Municipal fact sheet from Statistics Norway 

 
Municipalities of Vestland
1838 establishments in Norway